Benjamin Antin (August 4, 1884 – October 22, 1956) was an American lawyer and Democratic politician from New York.

Life
He was born on August 4, 1884, in Berlinez, then a village in the Podolia Governorate of the Russian Empire, now located in the Bar Raion, Vinnytsia Oblast, Ukraine. He emigrated to the United States in 1900. He attended the evening schools in New York City, and graduated from the College of the City of New York in 1910, and LL.B. from New York Law School in 1913. On August 18, 1918, he married Dora Polsky (c.1897–1970).
 
He was a member of the New York State Assembly (Bronx Co., 3rd D.) in 1921 and 1922. In 1921, the Citizens Union endorsed Antin for re-election, saying that he was "intelligently active in behalf of housing reform bills."

He was a member of the New York State Senate (22nd D.) from 1923 to 1930, sitting in the 146th, 147th, 148th, 149th, 150th, 151st, 152nd and 153rd New York State Legislatures; and was Chairman of the Committee on Education from 1923 to 1924.

In 1927, he published his autobiography: The Gentleman from the Twenty-Second (Boni & Liveright, New York City, 301 pages).

He died on October 22, 1956, at his home at 601 East 20th Street in the Bronx, after a long illness.

Notes

1884 births
1956 deaths
Democratic Party New York (state) state senators
Politicians from the Bronx
Democratic Party members of the New York State Assembly
New York Law School alumni
City College of New York alumni
Emigrants from the Russian Empire to the United States
People from Vinnytsia Oblast
20th-century American politicians